Alonso Ignacio Medel Araya (born 19 December 2001) is a Chilean badminton player. In 2016, he won the Chile International tournament in men's doubles event partnered with Diego Castillo and the runner-up in mixed doubles event partnered with Mickaela Skaric. He represented his country competed at the 2018 Summer Youth Olympics in Buenos Aires, Argentina.

Achievements

BWF International Challenge/Series 
Men's doubles

Mixed doubles

  BWF International Challenge tournament
  BWF International Series tournament
  BWF Future Series tournament

References

External links 
 

2001 births
Living people
People from Antofagasta
Chilean male badminton players
Badminton players at the 2018 Summer Youth Olympics
21st-century Chilean people